Vĩnh Trụ is a township and capital of Lý Nhân District, Hà Nam Province, Vietnam.

References

Populated places in Hà Nam province
District capitals in Vietnam
Townships in Vietnam